State Highway 318 (SH 318) is a state highway in Moffat County, Colorado. SH 318's western terminus is at Brown's Park Road at the Utah state line, and the eastern terminus is at U.S. Route 40 (US 40) in Maybell.

Route description
SH 318 runs , starting north of the Green River in an isolated area known as Browns Park. It connects at the Utah state line with gravel surfaced Brown's Park Road. The highway crosses Vermillion Creek, the Little Snake River and the Yampa River before ending at a junction with  US 40 in Maybell.

Major intersections

See also

 List of state highways in Colorado

References

External links

318
State Highway 318